Charles Howard Shinn was a horticulturalist, author, inspector of California Experiment Stations, and forest ranger in California.

Early life
He was born in Round Rock, Texas in 1852 to James and Lucy Shinn. The family moved to Alameda County near Vallejo's Mills, California in 1856. Vallejo's Mills became the town of Niles in 1869 (now a District in Fremont). Much of Charles Shinn's childhood was spent at the ranch and nursery of his family in Niles. His sister, Milicent Shinn, was an American child psychologist. His first cousin Edmund Clark Sanford was a prominent psychologist.

Education 
Shinn attended the state university for two years (now the University of California, Berkeley) and Johns Hopkins University from 1882-1884. He received a bachelor’s degree conferred “extra ordinary.”   While at Johns Hopkins University, his roommate was Woodrow Wilson.

Career 
Charles Shinn was a teacher in four counties in California from 1870 to 1876  and at Washington Corners in 1876. He was also a writer. In 1878, while teaching in Shasta County, he began the study of the mining district codes or laws of the 49ers and after.  His most famous book, Mining Camps (1885), was a result of field work there and in the Sierras. The emphasis of the German folk moot tradition espoused while he was at Johns Hopkins influenced his often romanticized writings about the early mining camps. Between 1879 and 1889 he wrote for newspapers and magazines in San Francisco, Baltimore, and New York. In 1879 he worked for the San Francisco Bulletin. In 1878 and 1880 he edited the California Horticulturalist and Floral Magazine. He published the Pacific Rural Handbook in 1879.  He was elected to be a director of the State Horticultural Society in 1879. During the late 1880s, he served as managing editor of Overland Monthly while continuing to publish articles on nature, mining, and rustic California.  Charles Howard Shinn was inspector of California Experiment Stations from 1890 to 1902 In 1900, he and his wife, Julia, were trustees of the Niles Library. He was later head forest ranger for the Department of the Interior. In 1914 he worked for the San Joaquin Valley Counties Association  He retired from his Forest Service position in July 1924.

Marriage 
Charles Shinn married Julia Charlotte Tyler on July 31, 1888 at the home of her father, Asher Tyler, in Oakland. She shared his interests in nature, worked at his side, and became one of the first women employed by the new U. S. Forest Service.

Death 
Charles Shinn spent the last 22 years of his life in North Fork, California. His home was named the "Peace Cabin". He retired as supervising forest ranger a year before he passed. He is buried in Ukiah, California.

Memorial 
Charles Shinn is remembered in the Sierra Club bulletin and in the Journal of Forestry. Coincidentally "Ranger Shinn; The Story of a Man Who Shaped His Life to Get the Greatest Happiness" was published in Sunset Magazine in the month that he died.

Mt. Shinn in the Sierra Nevada is named after Charles Howard Shinn. Mt. Shinn is 11,013 feet high, two miles south of the south fork of San Joaquin River, near latitude 37°13' longitude 118° 55'. It can be found on the USGS Topographic map "Ward Mountain Quadrangle" 2018.

Writings

Journal articles 
Charles Howard Shinn wrote for the Overland Monthly using a pseudonym, Stoner Brooke.
 "Novarro", Overland monthly and Out West magazine (Dec. 1874)
 "A Breath of Trees," Alameda County Independent (June 12, 1875)
"La Gaviota", Overland monthly and Out West magazine (Sep. 1875)
"Notes from a Greenhouse - No. 1" California Horticulturalist and Floral Magazine (June 1877)
"Notes from a Greenhouse - No. 2" California Horticulturalist and Floral Magazine (August 1877)
"Notes from a Greenhouse - No.4" California Horticulturalist and Floral Magazine (Sep. 1877)
"Notes from a Greenhouse - No.4" California Horticulturalist and Floral Magazine (Nov. 1877)
" The Diospyrus Kaki, or Japanese Persimmon, in California."  The Gardener's Monthly (Dec. 1877)
"Concerning Shade Trees" California Horticulturalist and Floral Magazine (Dec. 1877)
"Beneath Her Window" Atlantic Monthly (Dec. 1877)
"Laying Out the Garden" California Horticulturalist and Floral Magazine  (January 1878)
"Peculiar Drawbacks of California Farming" California Horticulturalist and Floral Magazine  (February 1878)
"Horticultural Gossip" California Horticulturalist and Floral Magazine  (March 1878) 
"Concerning Our Horticultural Future" California Horticulturalist and Floral Magazine  (May 1878)"
"A California Garden" Gardener's Monthly (June 1878)
"Garden Notes for July" California Horticulturalist and Floral Magazine  (July 1878)
"Garden Notes for August" California Horticulturalist and Floral Magazine  (August 1878)
"The Rhododenron" California Horticulturalist and Floral Magazine (August 1878)  
"Seeds and Seed Planting" California Horticulturalist and Floral Magazine (August 1878)
"Flower Voices" California Horticulturalist and Floral Magazine (October 1878)
"Her Rose Garden" Pacific Rural Press (30 Nov. 1878) Note that Shinn's Nurseries  in Niles were in operation at this time.
"Her Rose Garden. Being a Tale of Two Young Married People, and their Gardening Mishaps; Chapter II" (7 Dec. 1878)
"Her Rose Garden. Being a Tale of Two Young Married People, and their Gardening Mishaps; Chapter III" (14 Dec. 1878).
"Concerning a Satisfactory Flower Garden" December 1878 Note that CHS is editor: "Mr. Shinn is a young man of much literary promise, who has contributed horticultural articles to the Evening Bulletin, Rural Press, our own journal, the Southern California Horticulturist, the Gardener's Monthly, Vick's Monthly, the Rural New Yorker, and The Garden of London. His work has all been of a fresh and yet practical type, and has been widely read and copied."
"Her Rose Garden. Being a Tale of Two Young Married People, and their Gardening Mishaps; Chapter IV" (4 Jan. 1879). 
"Her Rose Garden. Being a Tale of Two Young Married People, and their Gardening Mishaps; Chapter V" (11 Jan. 1879). 
"A Summer in the Saddle" The Californian, June 6, 1880 
"Oxford University, and the Humanist Movement of 1498" (Mar. 1883)
"Guppy's Daughter", Overland Monthly (Aug. 1883)
"The Migration Problem", Overland monthly and Out West magazine (Sept 1883) 
"Thomas Lodge and His Friends", Overland monthly and Out West magazine (Feb. 1884)  
"California Mining Camps", Overland monthly and Out West magazine (Aug 1884)
"A Rhododendron Quest", Overland monthly and Out West magazine (June 1885)
"Early Horticulture in California", Overland Monthly (Aug. 1885) 
 "Shasta Lilies", Overland Monthly (Dec 1885)
"Spring Flowers of California", Overland monthly and Out West magazine (Apr. 1888)
 "Artesian Belt of the Upper San Joaquin", Overland Monthly (Aug. 1888) with illustrations by Ernest Peixotto
 "Early Books, Magazines, and Book-Making", Overland Monthly (Oct. 1888)
"From Klamath to the Rio Grande", Overland monthly and Out West magazine (Dec. 1888)
"The California Palestine", Overland monthly and Out West magazine (Jan. 1889)
"Two Shasta Desperados" (May 1889) p. 459 under pseudonym Stoner Brooke.
"The Building of Arachne", The Argonaut, 1889
"The Forest; Recent California Forest Fires", Garden and Forest, (Oct. 9,1889) 
"Old Mission San Jose Gardens", Garden and Forest (Sept. 11, 1889)
 "California Garden Gold", American Gardening (Jan. 1890)
 "An Early Winter Garden in California", American Gardening (Feb. 1890)
 "The Olive in California", American Gardening (Apr. 1890)
 "Spanish Pioneer Houses of California", the Magazine of American History (May 1890)
 "The Japanese Oranges", American Gardening (Jun. 1890)
"The Quicksands of Toro", Belford's Magazine (Jun. 1890-Nov.1890), p. 735-739 
 "An Old-Fashioned Countryside", American Gardening (Aug. 1890)
 "California Truck-Gardening", American Gardening (Oct. 1890)
 "Notes from a Pacific Peach Orchard", American Gardening (Dec. 1890)
 "California Rose Cottages", Vick's Illustrated Monthly Magazine (1891) Note that p. 48 has a photograph of the Shinn House.
 "Social Changes in California" The Popular Science Monthly (April 1891)
"The California Lakes", Overland monthly and Out West magazine (July 1891)
"Mission Bells" The Overland Monthly (Jan. 1892)
"Fig trees at the experiment stations" 1892
 "Irrigation in the Arid States" The Popular Science Monthly (June 1893)
 "The Fruit Industry in California" The Popular Science Monthly (December 1893)
"Agriculture and Horticulture at the Midwinter Fair", Overland monthly and Out West magazine (Apr. 1894)
"Apples at the Midwinter Fair" Garden and Forest (Apr. 4, 1894)
"A California Garden" Garden and Forest (June 6, 1894)
"Pacific Coast Seedling Fruits" Garden and Forest (June 20, 1894)
"Among the Experiment Stations" The Overland Monthly (August 1894)
"California Experiment Centres" Garden and Forest (Nov. 7, 1894)
"A Glimpse of a Californian Wild Garden" The Garden: An Illustrated Weekly Journal of Gardening in All Its Branches (April 11, 1896)
"Correspondence, Notes from Santa Barbara" Garden and Forest (June 17, 1896)
"The Wild Gardens of the Sierra" The Garden, An Illustrated Weekly Journal of Gardening in All Its Branches (Sep. 26, 1896) 
 "Nevada Silver" The Popular Science Monthly (Oct. 1896)
"Overland Monthly Reports: California Forests", Overland monthly and Out West magazine (May 1897)
"Northern California Gold Fields; Glimpses of Shasta, Trinity, and Siskiyou", Overland monthly and Out West magazine. (Dec. 1897) 
"Californian Forests", California: early history, commercial position, climate, scenery, forests, general resources (1897-1898)
"Forestry Problems of the San Joaquin", Overland monthly and Out West magazine (Aug. 1899)
"The Old Tioga Road", Overland monthly and Out West magazine (Nov. 1899)
"Citrus Fruits—Their History and Literature" (Mar. 1901)
"A Wizard of the Garden" (Mar. 1901)
"Wizards of the Gardens (Third Paper) Carl Purdy and the Native Bulbs" (May 1901)
"A Study of San Luis Obispo County, California", Sunset (Sept. 1901)
"Experimental Agriculture in California", Sunset (Nov. 1901)
"The Story of a Great California Estate; Rancho del Arroyo Chico, the Home of the late General John Bidwell" (Jan. 1902)
 "The Alvarado Squatters League" Out West magazine (1907)
"Sierra Gold" Overland Monthly (Apr. 1922)

Articles in The standard cyclopedia of horticulture 

 The fig in California  p. 1235-1238
 John Rock  p. 1593
 James Shinn p. 1596
 The sequoias  p. 3154-3156

Publications of the University of California 

 Verses in College Verses, along with verses from his sisters, Milicent Shinn and Annie Shinn, and his cousin Edmund Clark Sanford
Experiments with deciduous fruits at and near the Southern Coast Range sub-station, Paso Robles, from 1889 to 1902
The Russian Thistle in California 1895 
The Australian Salt-Bushes 1899 
Report of the Agricultural Experiment Station of the University of California, for the Years of 1891–1892, various reports
Report of the Agricultural Experiment Station of the University of California, for the Years of 1892–1893 and some 1894, Viticultural work 1887-1893
Report of the Agricultural Experiment Station of the University of California, for the Years of 1897–1898, various reports
Report of the Agricultural Experiment Station of the University of California, for the Years of 1898–1901, various reports
Report of the Agricultural Experiment Station of the University of California, for the Years of 1901–1903, various reports

Publications of the USDA 
 An Economic Study of Acacias (1913)
 Let's know some trees (1925)

Books 
 Pacific Rural Handbook (1879)
 Land Laws of Mining Districts (1884) 
 Mining Camps, a Study in American Frontier Government  (1885)
 Graphic description of Pacific coast outlaws. Thrilling exploits of their arch-enemy Sheriff Harry N. Morse (1887)
 Cooperation on the Pacific Coast (1888)
 Pioneer Spanish Families of California (1891)
 The Story of the Mine, as Illustrated by the Great Comstock Lode of Nevada (1896) and review
 Intensive Horticulture in California (1901) reprint from "The Land of Sunshine" about Luther Burbank and Carl Purdy
 A Study of San Luis Obispo County, California (1901) Sunset Magazine, September 
 Culture work at the substations, 1899-1901 (1902)
Chapters in Picturesque California, edited by John Muir, finished in October 1894
"The Foothill Region of the Northern Coast-Range: Sonoma, Napa, and Solano Valleys"
"The Tule Region"
"The Land of the Redwood"

Newspapers 
 Historical Sketches of Southern Alameda County (1991) contains a collection of Shinn's articles from the Oakland Enquirer (8 June - 18 Nov 1889).

Letters 

 Papers of Daniel Coit Gilman. Daniel Coit Gilman was Johns Hopkins University's first president, serving from 1876 to 1902
John Muir Papers. Charles Howard Shinn and Milicent Shinn have letters in this collection.

Shinn's Library 

 In 1917, Charles Howard Shinn's library was listed for auction "Catalogue of the Library of Mr. Charles Howard Shinn; The Well Known Writer on California" 
 History of the buried treasure on Cocos Island, and confession of the pirates the night before execution, in Kingston, Jamaica. Signed by C.H. Shinn

Online Books 

 Online Books Page

Biographies and Memorials 

 Forestry Education at the University of California; The first fifty Years, Paul Casamajor
 Charles Howard Shinn, Sierra Club Bulletin
 "Ranger Shinn; The Story of a Man Who Shaped His Life to Get the Greatest Happiness"; Dec. 1924, Sunset Magazine

Current References 

 Wall Street Journal, May 8, 2020, "‘Knucklehead’: From ‘The Three Stooges’ to Covid-19 Rulebreakers", Ben Zimmer, refers to "Quicksands of Toro"

Shinn Historic Park & Arboretum 
The park is in the city of Fremont, California and is the last 4 acres of Shinn's Nurseries and the Shinn Ranch. Three groups are active in the park. The Friends of Heirloom Flowers is the garden club that, since 1994, has taken care of the gardens around the historic Shinn House built in 1876, the Shinn Bungalow built around 1907, and the Sim Cottage built before 1856. The Mission Peak Heritage Foundation (MPHF) has managed the Shinn House and archive room since 1972. The Chinese Bunkhouse Preservation Project is a subcommittee of the MPHF and was formed to preserve the last remaining building from the Shinn Ranch China Camp.

References 

1852 births
1924 deaths
American foresters
American horticulturists
American male journalists